Huntington is the name of two places in the State of South Carolina:

Huntington, Laurens County, South Carolina
Huntington, Sumter County, South Carolina